Oleg Sergeyevich Krasilnichenko (born 21 January 1997) is a Russian footballer. He plays for Dynamo Makhachkala.

Club career
He made his debut in the Russian Football National League for FC Spartak-2 Moscow on 8 July 2017 in a game against FC Sibir Novosibirsk.

References

External links
 
 Profile by Russian Football National League

1997 births
People from Krymsk
Sportspeople from Krasnodar Krai
Living people
Russian footballers
Russia youth international footballers
Association football defenders
FC Spartak-2 Moscow players
FC Neftekhimik Nizhnekamsk players
FC Fakel Voronezh players
FC Dynamo Makhachkala players
Russian First League players
Russian Second League players